Roio Piano  is a frazione of L'Aquila in the Abruzzo, region of Italy.  In the 13th century it was one of the fortified settlements which formed the city of L'Aquila, although Roio maintained a degree of autonomy and, later, a separate comune until 1927.

 

Frazioni of L'Aquila
Former municipalities of the Province of L'Aquila